The 1994 Superbike World Championship was the seventh FIM Superbike World Championship season. The season started on 2 May at Donington and finished on 30 October at Phillip Island after 11 rounds.

Carl Fogarty won the riders' championship with 10 victories and Ducati won the manufacturers' championship.

Race calendar and results

Championship standings

Riders' standings

Manufacturers' standings

References

External links

Superbike World Championship
Superbike World Championship seasons